McKenna Park is a  public park in the University Park neighborhood of Portland, Oregon, in the United States. The park was acquired in 1940.

References

External links

 

1940 establishments in Oregon
Parks in Portland, Oregon
Protected areas established in 1940
University Park, Portland, Oregon